The 2013 French Open was a tennis tournament played on outdoor clay courts. It was the 117th edition of the French Open and the second Grand Slam event of the year. It took place at the Stade Roland Garros from 26 May to 9 June. It consisted of events for professional players in singles, doubles and mixed doubles play. Junior and wheelchair players also took part in singles and doubles events.

Rafael Nadal was the three-time defending champion in the men's singles, and won the title to become the first man to win the same Grand Slam title eight times. Maria Sharapova was the defending champion in women's singles, but lost in the final to Serena Williams.

This championship was the third time in grand slam history that two multiple slam sets were accomplished in two different disciplines, and that was Serena Williams in Women's Singles, and her fellow countrymen Bob and Mike Bryan in Men's Doubles. At the 1969 US Open, Rod Laver won his multiple slam set in Men's Singles, and his fellow countryman Ken Rosewall did in Men's Doubles. At the 2012 French Open, Mahesh Bhupathi won a multiple slam set in Mixed Doubles, and Esther Vergeer won her multiple slam set in Women's Wheelchair Doubles.

In the women's singles final, it marked the first French Open since 1995 that the top two seeded players had played each other in the final, and the first time at any grand slam event since the 2004 Australian Open that the top two seeded players had played each other in a grand slam final.

Tournament

The 2013 French Open was the 112th edition of the French Open and was held at Stade Roland Garros in Paris.

The tournament was an event run by the International Tennis Federation (ITF) and was part of the 2013 ATP World Tour and the 2013 WTA Tour calendars under the Grand Slam category. The tournament consisted of both men's and women's singles and doubles draws as well as a mixed doubles event.

There were singles and doubles events for both boys and girls (players under 18), which were part of the Grade A category of tournaments, and singles and doubles events for men's and women's wheelchair tennis players as part of the NEC tour under the Grand Slam category. The tournament was played on clay courts and took place over a series of twenty courts, including the three main showcourts, Court Philippe Chatrier, Court Suzanne Lenglen and Court 1.

Point and prize money distribution

Point distribution
Below is a series of tables for each of the competitions showing the ranking points on offer for each event.

Seniors points

Wheelchair points

1 is for Men's, Women's and Quad Singles
2 is for Men's and Women's Doubles

Junior points

Prize money
The French Open's total prize money for 2013 has been increased by more than three million euros to 22 million euros ($28.77 million). The winners of the men's and women's singles titles will each earn 1.5 million euros, up 250,000 euros from last year. The move was part of plans to boost the total prize money by a further 10 million euros to 32 million euros by 2016. In comparison, US Open prize money will reach $33.6 million this year and rise to $50 million by 2017, while Wimbledon prize money was more than 16 million pounds ($24.61 million) in 2012. In the 2013 season, the French Open's prize money is the lowest out of four grand slam tournaments, compared to $30m at the Australian Open, $34m at Wimbledon, and $32m at the US Open.

* per team

Singles players

Men's singles

Women's singles

Day-by-day summaries

Singles seeds
The following are the seeded players and notable players who withdrew from the event. Rankings are as of 20 May 2013 and the Points are as of 27 May 2013. It had been reported that the French Open was considering giving Nadal a seeding higher than his current world ranking (No. 4), on the basis of his history at the tournament, but French Open tournament organisers decided against it.

Men's singles

1Robredo has 100 points coming off after the French Open because of a challenger tournament (Città di Caltanissetta) he won when not attending the 2012 French Open. Therefore, 100 points must be subtracted from his old points.

Withdrawn players

Women's singles

Main draw wildcard entries

Men's singles
  Marc Gicquel
  Alex Kuznetsov
  Nick Kyrgios
  Nicolas Mahut
  Adrian Mannarino
  Gaël Monfils
  Lucas Pouille
  Florent Serra

Women's singles
  Ashleigh Barty
  Claire Feuerstein
  Stéphanie Foretz-Gacon
  Caroline Garcia
  Irena Pavlovic
  Virginie Razzano
  Aravane Rezaï
  Shelby Rogers

Men's doubles
  Jonathan Dasnières de Veigy /  Florent Serra
  Jonathan Eysseric /  Fabrice Martin
  Marc Gicquel /  Édouard Roger-Vasselin
  Pierre-Hugues Herbert /  Nicolas Renavand
  Paul-Henri Mathieu /  Lucas Pouille
  Gaël Monfils /  Josselin Ouanna
  Albano Olivetti /  Maxime Teixeira

Women's doubles
  Séverine Beltrame /  Laura Thorpe
  Julie Coin /  Pauline Parmentier
  Alizé Cornet /  Virginie Razzano
  Stéphanie Foretz Gacon /  Irena Pavlovic
  Caroline Garcia /  Mathilde Johansson
  Alizé Lim /  Aravane Rezaï
  Serena Williams /  Venus Williams

Mixed doubles
  Séverine Beltrame /  Benoît Paire
  Julie Coin /  Nicolas Mahut
  Alizé Cornet /  Gilles Simon
  Stéphanie Foretz Gacon /  Édouard Roger-Vasselin
  Caroline Garcia /  Marc Gicquel
  Alizé Lim /  Jérémy Chardy

Qualifiers

Men's singles qualifiers

  Jiří Veselý
  Vasek Pospisil
  Steve Darcis
  Pere Riba
  Steve Johnson
  Andreas Beck
  Julian Reister
  Somdev Devvarman
  Pablo Carreño Busta
  Maxime Teixeira
  Denis Kudla
  Jan-Lennard Struff
  Jack Sock
  Daniel Muñoz de la Nava
  Michał Przysiężny
  James Duckworth

The following players received entry as lucky losers:
  Andreas Haider-Maurer
  Illya Marchenko
  Rhyne Williams

Women's singles qualifiers

  Barbora Záhlavová-Strýcová
  Mariana Duque Mariño
  Vania King
  Yuliya Beygelzimer
  Paula Ormaechea
  Grace Min
  Anna Karolína Schmiedlová
  Dinah Pfizenmaier
  Sandra Záhlavová
  Galina Voskoboeva
  Julia Glushko
  Zuzana Kučová

Protected ranking
The following players were accepted directly into the main draw using a protected ranking:

 Men's Singles
  Pablo Cuevas (PR 54)
  Jürgen Zopp (PR 88)

 Women's Singles
  Elena Baltacha (PR 103)
  Flavia Pennetta (PR 14)

Champions

Seniors

Men's singles

 Rafael Nadal defeated  David Ferrer, 6–3, 6–2, 6–3
It was Nadal's 12th grand slam title and his 8th at the French Open (a record). It was his 6th career title of the year.

Women's singles

 Serena Williams defeated  Maria Sharapova, 6–4, 6–4

It was Williams' 16th grand slam title and her second at the French Open. It was her 52nd singles title of her career and sixth of 2013.

Men's doubles

 Bob Bryan /  Mike Bryan defeated  Michaël Llodra /  Nicolas Mahut, 6–4, 4–6, 7–6(7–4)
It was the Bryan brothers' 14th grand slam doubles title and their second at the French Open.

Women's doubles

 Ekaterina Makarova /  Elena Vesnina defeated  Sara Errani /  Roberta Vinci, 7–5, 6–2
It was Makarova and Vesnina's 1st grand slam doubles title.

Mixed doubles

 Lucie Hradecká /  František Čermák defeated  Kristina Mladenovic /  Daniel Nestor, 1–6, 6–4, [10–6]
It was Hradecká 1st grand slam mixed doubles title and her second at the French Open.
It was Čermák's 1st grand slam mixed doubles title.

Juniors

Boys' singles

 Cristian Garín defeated  Alexander Zverev, 6–4, 6–1

Girls' singles

 Belinda Bencic defeated  Antonia Lottner, 6–1, 6–3

Boys' doubles

 Kyle Edmund /  Frederico Ferreira Silva defeated  Cristian Garín /  Nicolás Jarry, 6–3, 6–3

Girls' doubles

 Barbora Krejčíková /  Kateřina Siniaková defeated  Doménica González /  Beatriz Haddad Maia, 7–5, 6–2

Wheelchair events

Wheelchair men's singles

 Stéphane Houdet defeated  Shingo Kunieda, 7–5, 5–7, 7–6(7–5)

Wheelchair women's singles

 Sabine Ellerbrock defeated  Jiske Griffioen, 6–3, 3–6, 6–1

Wheelchair men's doubles

 Stéphane Houdet /  Shingo Kunieda defeated  Gordon Reid /  Ronald Vink, 3–6, 6–4, [10–6]

Wheelchair women's doubles

 Jiske Griffioen /  Aniek van Koot defeated  Sabine Ellerbrock /  Sharon Walraven, 6–2, 6–3

Other events

Legends under 45 doubles

 Cédric Pioline /  Fabrice Santoro defeated  Albert Costa /  Carlos Moyá, 4–6, 6–4, [4–1] ret.

Legends over 45 doubles

 Andrés Gómez /  Mark Woodforde defeated  Mansour Bahrami /  Pat Cash, 6–1, 7–6(7–2)

Women's legends doubles

 Lindsay Davenport /  Martina Hingis defeated  Elena Dementieva /  Martina Navratilova, 6–4, 6–2

Withdrawals
The following players were accepted directly into the main tournament, but withdrew with injuries or personal reasons.

Men's Singles
 Brian Baker → replaced by  João Sousa
 Thomaz Bellucci → replaced by  Illya Marchenko
 Juan Martín del Potro → replaced by  Andreas Haider-Maurer
 Mardy Fish → replaced by  Guido Pella
 Andy Murray → replaced by  Rhyne Williams

Women's Singles
 Lara Arruabarrena →replaced by  Nina Bratchikova
 Chan Yung-jan → replaced by  Shahar Pe'er
 Alexandra Dulgheru → replaced by  Tatjana Maria
 Aleksandra Wozniak → replaced by  Kristýna Plíšková

References

External links

 Official website
 French Open Live Streaming